Slovenska Vas is a settlement in the Municipality of Brežice in eastern Slovenia, next to the border with Croatia. The area is part of the traditional region of Lower Carniola. During the Second World War, when it was known as Bregansko selo, it was one of five Slovene settlements annexed by the Independent State of Croatia. It is now included with the rest of the municipality in the Lower Sava Statistical Region.

Name
The name of the settlement was changed from Bregansko selo to Slovenska vas in 1993.

References

External links
Slovenska Vas on Geopedia

Populated places in the Municipality of Brežice